Thamsanqa Innocent Mkhize (born 18 August 1988) is a South African professional soccer player who plays for and captains Cape Town City. As well as plays for the South African national team.

Career statistics

International

References

1988 births
Living people
Sportspeople from Durban
Association football midfielders
South African soccer players
South Africa international soccer players
Lamontville Golden Arrows F.C. players
Maritzburg United F.C. players
Cape Town City F.C. (2016) players
South African Premier Division players
2019 Africa Cup of Nations players